The 110 metres hurdles at the 2007 World Championships in Athletics was held at the Nagai Stadium in Osaka, Japan from August 29 to August 31.

Medalists

Records

Schedule

Results

Heats
Qualification: First 3 in each heat (Q) and the next 9 fastest (q) advance to the semi-finals.

Semi-finals
Qualification: First 2 in each semi-final (Q) and the next 2 fastest (q) advance to the final.

Final

External links
Results

Hurdles110 metres
Sprint hurdles at the World Athletics Championships